is a Japanese voice actor from Kanagawa Prefecture, Japan. He is affiliated with and representative of T's Factory, a voice acting agency he founded in October 1998. Koyasu has taken over many of the characters played by Kaneto Shiozawa after his death.

Career
When Koyasu was in junior high school, he, as an aspiring screen actor himself, was such a movie buff that he would watch movies every day without going to school. By chance, he saw the scene before Tetsurō Hoshino's departure in Adieu Galaxy Express 999 where a group of nameless soldiers take him on the 999 and send him on his way, and was impressed by it. This sparked his interest in voice acting, and since then it has been his policy to aim for "three-dimensional acting." After graduating from high school, he entered a training school. In 1988, he made his voice acting debut in Wowser, and in 1989, he played his first regular character as Gai, the King Yaksha in Legend of Heavenly Sphere Shurato. Although he was a regular character in the series, he was in the position of a villain whose inner workings were rarely discussed in the story, so it was difficult for Koyasu to grasp the role and he had to do several dozen retakes for a single line. He later said that although his name recognition as a voice actor had increased, he did not feel like he was doing his best.

Afterwards, Koyasu played the role of Minos in the OVA Aries released in 1990. The OVA was based on a fantasy manga of the same name that was being serialized at the time, and the voice actors for the main characters were to be decided by a magazine reader's vote. Since Koyasu had appeared in Shurato shortly before this, he had some recognition among the viewers, and he received the most votes for the role of Hades, the main character. However, at the time, Koyasu was still an unknown name in the voice acting industry, and the production members voiced their concerns about giving the lead role to a newcomer like Koyasu. As a result, the results of the readers' poll were rejected, and Koyasu was given the role of Hades' subordinate Minos, a role with little screentime.

In Tekkaman Blade, Koyasu played the main character's rival, Tekkaman Evil (Shinya Aiba). Koyasu himself has often said in interviews that this is his favorite character, and after a period of sluggish performance, he put his voice acting career on the line to play the role, which ultimately led to his recovery. He also said that when he was playing the character, he thought he was really great, but when he watched the footage again later in life, he thought he was terrible at it, which led him to believe he was making progress.

In the late 1990s, Koyasu worked on conceptualizing for the media franchise Weiß Kreuz. He also formed the voice acting unit "Weiß" consisting of voice castmates Shin-ichiro Miki, Tomokazu Seki and Hiro Yūki, and became the first male voice actor to appear on the cover of a voice acting magazine and the first voice actor to make a music clip. In 2000–2001, he was active in music under the name ZAZEL.

After working as a member of Production Baobab (1988–1998), Koyasu established his own representative office, T's Factory, in 1998. On May 5, 2020, on the occasion of his birthday, the official website and Twitter account of T's Factory were opened, and his profile was also released at the same time.

In 2020, Koyasu made his first appearance with his son, voice actor Kōki Koyasu, in an advertisement for Duel Masters. In April, he and Kōki teamed up for their own radio show, "Takehito & Kōki's KOYASU RADIO."

In 2021, he won the Best Actor in Supporting Role award at the 15th Seiyu Awards.

Koyasu's name "Takehito" comes from the fact that his birthday is on Children's Day. His motto is to "make two-dimensional into three-dimensional." His hobby is writing novels and he professes to like video games. He has played every game he has appeared in, but he is not very good at action or shooting games.

Filmography

Television animation

Original video animation (OVA)

Original net animation (ONA)

Films

Video games

Anima Mundi: Dark Alchemist, Bruno Glening
Another Century's Episode 2, Zechs Merquise
Ar tonelico II, Alfman Uranous
Arena of Valor, Valhein, Dirak
Atelier Lydie & Suelle: The Alchemists and the Mysterious Paintings, Roger Malen
Battle Arena Toshinden, Kayin Amoh
Beyond the Labyrinth
Bravely Default, Braev Lee the Templar
Breath of Fire 6, Masamune
The Caligula Effect 2, Bluffman
Captain Tsubasa: Dream Team, Rivaul
Catherine, Jonathan Ariga
Cookie Run: Kingdom, Ninja Cookie
The Crew (Japanese Dub), Alex Taylor
Demonbane (PS2 version) – Winfield
Disgaea 2: Cursed Memories, Mr. Rabbit, Fubuki, Badass Overlord Zeta
Disgaea 5: Alliance of Vengeance, Red Magnus
Dissidia Final Fantasy: Opera Omnia, Seifer Almasy
Dragalia Lost, Morsayati/The Other, Mordecai, Xenos/The Progenitor
Dragon Force II, Shepherd
Dragon Quest VIII: Journey of the Cursed King, Dhoulmagus
Dynasty Warriors: Gundam, Zechs Merquise
Dynasty Warriors: Gundam 2, Zechs Merquise, Gym Ghingnham
Dynasty Warriors: Gundam 3, Zechs Merquise, Gym Ghingnham
Dynasty Warriors Gundam Reborn, Zechs Merquise, Gym Ghingnham
EVE new generation, Kojiro Amagi
E.X. Troopers, Gingira
Family Project, Lau (as Hayato Jumonji)
Fate/Grand Order, Hans Christian Andersen, Mephistopheles, Ozymandias (Ramesses II)
Fate/EXTRA CCC, Hans Christian Andersen
Final Fantasy Crystal Chronicles: Remastered Edition, Stiltzkin
Fist of the North Star: Ken's Rage, Rei
Fire Emblem Awakening, Lon'qu, Validar
Fire Emblem Fates, Niles
Fire Emblem Heroes, Lon'qu, Niles, Navarre, Saber, Lewyn, Pent
Fire Emblem Echoes: Shadows of Valentia (2017), Saber
Fire Emblem: Three Houses (2019), Seteth
Fire Emblem Engage (2023), Kagetsu 
Galerians, Birdman
GetAmped2, Fabicro
Grandia Xtreme, Kroitz
Growlanser III: The Dual Darkness, Zion
Guilty Gear X2#Reload, Eddie
Gundam Versus, Zechs Merquise, Gym Ghingnham. Mu La Flaga
Heroes Phantasia, Kululu
Hoshizora no Memoria -Wish upon a shooting star-, Haruto Okaizumi
Hoshizora no Memoria Eternal Heart, Haruto Okaizumi
The Idolmaster SP, Takao Kuroi
Initial D Extreme Stage, Ryosuke Takahashi
Kamen Rider: Memory of Heroez (2020), Zeus Dopant
Kenka Bancho 6: Soul and Blood, Mido Tatsuya
Keroro RPG: Kishi to Musha to Densetsu no Kaizoku, Kululu
Kingdom Hearts II, Seifer Almasy
League of Legends, Sett
The Legend of Heroes: Trails in the Sky, Olivert Reise Arnor/Olivier Lenheim
The Legend of Heroes: Trails of Cold Steel, Olivert Reise Arnor/Olivier Lenheim
The Legend of Heroes: Trails to Azure, Olivert Reise Arnor/Olivier Lenheim
Lego Island, Return, Snap Lockitt
Lux-Pain, Liu Yee
Magical Drop III, Hierophant, Hanged Man, Chariot
Mighty No. 9, Mr. Graham
Musashi: Samurai Legend, Gandrake
Muv-Luv, Takahashi Ichimonji, Naoya Sagiri
Muv-Luv Alternative, Takahashi Ichimonji, Naoya Sagiri
Phantom Kingdom, Zetta
Nana, Takumi Ichinose
Onmyoji, Lord Arakawa (Arakawa no Aruji)
Nora to Toki no Kōbō: Kiri no Mori no Majo, Juka Waltnen
Persona 2 Innocent Sin/Eternal Punishment, Tatsuya Suou
Poporogue, Boris
Remember11: The Age of Infinity, Satoru Yukidoh
Resonance of Fate, Sullivan
Rockman DASH 2, Glyde
Sdorica, Jahan Augustinus, Hyde Oust
SD Gundam G Generation World, Zechs Merquise/Miliardo Peacecraft, Mu La Flaga, Neo Roanoke
Sengoku Basara, Sarutobi Sasuke
Shadow Hearts: Covenant, Nicolas/Nicolai Conrad
Shin Megami Tensei: Strange Journey Redux, Arthur
Shining Force Neo, Klein
Soulcalibur V, Creation Male Voice Super Human
Super Robot Wars, Shu Shirakawa, Gym Ghingnham, Zechs Merquise/Miliardo Peacecraft, Mu La Flaga, Neo Roanoke, Gamrin Kizaki, Abe no Seimei, Asuham Boone
Tales of the Abyss, Jade Curtiss
Tales of Zestiria, Lunarre, Jade Curtiss
Transformers: Beast Wars Transmetals, Beast Convoy
Tokimeki Memorial Girl's Side, Himuro Reiichi
Tokyo Mirage Sessions ♯FE, Navarre, Lon'qu
Valkyrie Profile: Lenneth, Lezard Valeth
Valkyrie Profile 2: Silmeria, Lezard Valeth
Yu-Gi-Oh! Duel Links (2016) – Pandora, Takuma Saiou
Hakuoki: Kyoto Winds, Kanryusai Takeda
Hakuoki: Edo Blossoms, Kanryusai Takeda

Drama CDs
17 Sai no Hisoka na Yokujou, Takamura
Anatolia Story Sound Theater 8, Ramses
Ballettstar, Tachibana Miyuki
Corsair, Yani
Fire Emblem, Reimeihen & Shiranhen (Nabarl)
Fruits Basket (1999), Ayame Sohma
Fushigi Yūgi Genbu Kaiden, Urumiya
GFantasy Comic CD Collection Fire Emblem: Ankoku Ryū to Hikari no Ken, Nabarl
Hakushaku to Yōsei, Kelpie
Hanazakari no Kimitachi e, Masao Himejima
Hatoful Boyfriend, Shuu Iwamine
Hello!! Doctor, Taku Kagami
Himitsu no Kateikyoushi, Koki Amagata
Katsuai series 1, Reiji Takami
The King of Fighters Drama CDs, Yabuki Shingo
Majin Tantei Nougami Neuro radio drama – Neuro Nougami
Meine Liebe, Isaac Cavendish
My Sexual Harassment series 2: Yume Kamoshirenai, young man
Needless, Adam Blade
Onmyouden no Tobira, Hotaru
Otokonoko niwa Himitsu ga Aru, Shiratori
Papa to Mira series 1: Kiss in the Dark, Takayuki Utsunomiya
Papa to Mira series 2: Loving All Night, Takayuki Utsunomiya
Papa to Mira series 3: Deep in the Forest, Takayuki Utsunomiya
Pink na Chopin
Punch Up!, Maki Motoharu
Sex Pistols-Love Pistols, Madarame Yonekuni
Requiem of the Rose King (2017), Warwick
Suikoden, Gremio
Superior, Kagami
Tales of the Abyss, Jade Curtiss
Target in the Finder, Asami Ryuichi
The Epic of Zektbach～Masinowa～, Gijiri
Vampire Knight, Headmaster Cross
Ze, Moriya

Dubbing

Live-action

Animation

References

External links

 
VELVET UNDER WORLD official page 
Takehito Koyasu at GamePlaza-Haruka Voice Acting Database 
Takehito Koyasu at Hitoshi Doi's Seiyuu Database

1967 births
Living people
Japanese male video game actors
Japanese male voice actors
Male voice actors from Yokohama
Production Baobab voice actors
Seiyu Award winners
20th-century Japanese male actors
21st-century Japanese male actors